The 1937 Brooklyn Dodgers season was their eighth in the league. The team improved on their previous season's output of 3–8–1, losing only seven games. They failed to qualify for the playoffs for the sixth consecutive season.

Schedule

Standings

References

Brooklyn Dodgers (NFL) seasons
Brooklyn Dodgers (NFL)
Brooklyn
1930s in Brooklyn
Flatbush, Brooklyn